A list of rivers of Mecklenburg-Vorpommern, Germany:

A
Aubach
Augraben, tributary of the Nebel
Augraben, tributary of the Tollense

B
Barthe
Beke
Bietnitz
Boize
Brebowbach
Bresenitz
Brüeler Bach

D
Datze
Delvenau
Dollbek
Drosedower Bek
Duwenbeek

E
Elbe
Elde

G
Gadebuscher Bach
Gehlsbach
Goldbach
Göwe
Groote Beek
Großer Landgraben
Grube

H
Hanshäger Bach
Harkenbäk
Havel

K
Kleine Sude
Kleiner Landgraben
Kösterbeck
Krainke
Küstriner Bach

L
Landgraben
Linde
Löcknitz
Lößnitz

M
Maurine
Meynbach
Mildenitz
Moosterbach
Motel, tributary of the Schilde
Motel, tributary of the Warnow
Mützelburger Beeke

N
Nebel
Nonne

O
Oberbek
Oder

P
Peene
Peenestrom

R
Radegast
Randow
Recknitz
Rögnitz
Ryck

S
Schaale
Schilde
Schillerbach
Schmaar
Schwinge
Stege
Steinbach
Stendlitz
Stepenitz
Stör
Sude

T
Tarnitz
Temse
Tiene
Tollense
Trebel

U
Uecker
Unterwarnow

W
Waidbach
Wakenitz
Warbel
Warnow
Wocker

Z
Zare
Zarnow
Zarow
Ziemenbach
Ziese

 
Meck
Riv